Tiago Manuel Pinto Cintra (born 5 July 1989) is a Portuguese footballer who plays as a forward.

Club career
Born in Matosinhos, Porto metropolitan area, Cintra played futsal before spending most of his youth career with hometown club Leixões SC, while also having a spell FC Porto. Loaned to Amarante F.C. of the third division in the 2008–09 season, he made his senior debut.

Cintra played 17 times and scored once in the Primeira Liga in the 2009–10 campaign, as Leixões were relegated. A year later, he moved to S.C. Beira-Mar also in the top flight, where he was a fringe player for his first two seasons and was loaned to Segunda Liga side C.D. Aves in January 2013.

In July 2014, Cintra signed a one-year deal with second-division S.C. Freamunde. Both he and fellow unemployed player Tiago Terroso were taken on by Varzim S.C. in November 2015, to play in the reserve team in the third tier. He later represented in that league C.D. Pinhalnovense and F.C. Pedras Rubras, as well as Leixões' reserves in amateur football.

International career
Cintra won one cap for Portugal at under-21 level, coming on as a 60th-minute substitute in the 1–0 away loss against England for the 2011 UEFA European Championship qualifiers on 13 November 2009.

References

External links

1989 births
Living people
Sportspeople from Matosinhos
Portuguese footballers
Association football forwards
Primeira Liga players
Liga Portugal 2 players
Segunda Divisão players
Leixões S.C. players
Amarante F.C. players
S.C. Beira-Mar players
C.D. Aves players
S.C. Freamunde players
C.D. Pinhalnovense players
F.C. Pedras Rubras players
F.C. Maia players
Portugal youth international footballers
Portugal under-21 international footballers